Waldo Salt: A Screenwriter's Journey is a 1990 American documentary film directed by Eugene Corr. It was nominated for an Academy Award for Best Documentary Feature. The film was screened at the 1990 Sundance Film Festival  and is a part of the PBS American Masters series of documentary films.

The documentary is about the life and work of American screenwriter Waldo Salt who was put on the Hollywood blacklist in the 1950s but went on to win two Academy Awards in the 1970s. The story is told through interviews with collaborators and friends such as Dustin Hoffman, Robert Redford, Jon Voight, John Schlesinger and with clips from Salt's films, chiefly Midnight Cowboy.

Archive
The Academy Film Archive houses the Waldo Salt: A Screenwriter's Journey Collection, which consists of approximately three hundred items, including film prints and film and audio production elements.

References

External links

 Waldo Salt: A Screenwriter's Journey on American Masters
 Waldo Salt: A Screenwriter's Journey on TCM.com
 , posted by Eugene Corr

1990 films
American documentary films
American black-and-white films
1990s English-language films
Screenwriting
Documentary films about writers
Documentary films about Hollywood, Los Angeles
American Masters films
Salt, Waldo
Salt, Waldo
1990s American films